Huddersfield Town's 1979–80 campaign is one of Town's most successful in their history, gaining promotion from the Division 4 title, the last season in which Town won the divisional title. They finished two points clear of Walsall. In Mick Buxton's first full season in charge, Town scored 101 league goals, the only season in which Town have scored more than 100 league goals in their entire history. This ended Town's five-year stint in the basement division. The only season after this that they were in the 4th tier was in the 2003–04 season.

Squad at the start of the season

Review
With Mick Buxton at the helm for his first full season, many were thinking that after his team's good form in the previous season, that promotion to Division 3 was possible and a good start to the season didn't dampen spirits. In the first 12 games, Town won 10 of them including a 7–1 win against Port Vale. But after a run in November and December of 4 games without a win, manager Buxton brought in Steve Kindon from Burnley just before Christmas. It proved to be an inspired signing, he scored 14 goals in his 23 games for Town during the second half of the season.

However, Ian Robins topped the goalscoring charts for the whole 4th Division with 25 league goals. He and Malcolm Brown were put in the "Divisional Team of the Season". They guaranteed their promotion with a 2–1 win over Scunthorpe United with 3 matches to go. Amongst other big victories were 5–0 victories against Northampton Town, Stockport County, Halifax Town and a 5–1 win over Rochdale. The last game of the season against Hartlepool United also saw Town scored their 100th and 101st league goals of their season, the only time Town have reached triple figures in goals in their entire history. They finished 2 points clear of Walsall in 1st position. This is their last season as champions of any division.

Squad at the end of the season

Results

Division Four

FA Cup

Football League Cup

Appearances and goals

1979-80
English football clubs 1979–80 season